Acidon is a genus of moths of the family Erebidae. The genus was erected by George Hampson in 1896.

Species
Some species of this genus are:

Acidon albolineata (Hampson, 1895) (from India and Bhutan)
Acidon bigrammica  (Saalmüller, 1880) (from Madagascar)
Acidon evae Lödl, 1998 (from India, Hong Kong)
Acidon hemiphaea (Hampson 1906) (from India)
Acidon mariae Lödl,  (from Java and Malaysia)
Acidon mediobrunnea  (Holloway, 1976) (from Borneo)
Acidon nigribasis (Hampson, 1895) (India and Sri Lanka, Borneo)
Acidon obscurobasalis  (Saalmüller, 1880) (from Madagascar)
Acidon paradoxa Hampson, 1896 (from Bhutan)
Acidon sabada (Swinhoe, 1905 (from Malaysia)
Acidon steniptera (Hampson, 1902) (from India)
Acidon rectilineata (Hampson, 1896) (from India)

References

Hypeninae
Moth genera